Keith Alan Lockhart (born November 7, 1959) is an American conductor. He is the Conductor of the Boston Pops Orchestra, the Chief Guest Conductor of the BBC Concert Orchestra, and the Artistic Director of the Brevard Music Center in North Carolina.

Early life
Born on November 7, 1959, in Poughkeepsie, New York, Lockhart is the elder of two children born to Newton Frederick and Marilyn Jean (Woodyard) Lockhart, who worked as computer professionals. He grew up in nearby Wappingers Falls and was educated in the public schools of New York's Dutchess County. He began studying piano at age seven. Lockhart graduated in 1981 from Furman University with a double major in German and piano performance. After transitioning from piano, he then went on to get a master's degree in orchestral conducting from Carnegie Mellon University. Lockhart was initiated into Phi Mu Alpha Sinfonia fraternity in 1978 by the Gamma Eta chapter at Furman University.

Musical career
Lockhart's conducting career began as the associate conductor of both the Cincinnati Symphony and Cincinnati Pops orchestras, as well as music director of the Cincinnati Chamber Orchestra. Keith Lockhart has conducted more than 1,900 Boston Pops concerts, most of which have taken place during the orchestra's spring and holiday seasons in Boston’s historic Symphony Hall. Lockhart has also led annual Boston Pops appearances at Tanglewood, 43 national tours to more than 150 cities in 38 states, and four international tours to Japan and Korea. He and the Pops have made 79 television shows for the long-running television show Evening At Pops and participated in such high-profile sporting events as Super Bowl XXXVI, the 2008 NBA finals, the 2013 Boston Red Sox Ring Ceremony, the Red Sox Opening Day game at Fenway Park in 2009, and Game 2 of the 2018 World Series at Fenway Park. The annual July 4th Boston Pops Fireworks Spectacular draws a live audience of over half a million to the Charles River Esplanade and millions more who view it on television or live webcast.

Lockhart and the Boston Pops have recorded eight albums for the RCA Victor label, including two—The Celtic Album and The Latin Album—that earned Grammy nominations. Recent releases on Boston Pops Recordings include The Red Sox Album, A Boston Pops Christmas: Live from Symphony Hall, and The Dream Lives On: A Portrait of the Kennedy Brothers, which was a Boston Pops commission premiered in 2010 during the orchestra's 125th season. Released at the beginning of the 2017 Pops season, Lights, Camera … Music! Six Decades of John Williams features Keith Lockhart leading the Boston Pops in a collection of Williams compositions from the 1960s onward, some of which can be considered rarities.

From 1998 to 2009, Lockhart was also the music director of the Utah Symphony where he conducted three “Salute to the Symphony” television specials broadcast, one of which received an Emmy award. In 2010, Lockhart became the principal conductor of the BBC Concert Orchestra. He conducted The Star-Spangled Banner in the opening ceremonies of the 2002 Olympic Winter Games in Salt Lake City. He concluded his tenure as principal conductor of the BBC Concert Orchestra at the end of December 2017, and took the title of chief guest conductor of the orchestra, effective January 2018. Lockhart is also the Artistic Director of the Brevard Music Center summer institute and festival, a program which he attended as an adolescent.

Keith Lockhart has conducted nearly every major orchestra in North America as well as the Royal Concertgebouw Orchestra, the Deutsches Symphonie-Orchestra Berlin, the NHK Symphony in Tokyo and the Melbourne Symphony Orchestra. In October 2012, he made his London Philharmonic debut in Royal Albert Hall. In the opera pit, Maestro Lockhart has conducted productions with the Atlanta Opera, Washington Opera, Boston Lyric Opera, and Utah Opera. 2015–2016 included debut appearances with the Czech Philharmonic, the Orchestra dell'Accademia Nazionale di Santa Cecilia in Rome, the Vienna Radio Symphony, and the Hong Kong Philharmonic. He also completed a recording of the Bernstein Serenade with violinist Anne Akiko Meyers and the London Symphony Orchestra.

Personal life
Lockhart has been married three times.  His first marriage was to his college sweetheart, Ann Louise Heatherington, after he graduated from Furman University. The couple divorced two years later. In 1996, Lockhart married Boston Symphony violinist Lucia Lin. The marriage produced one son, Aaron, born in 2003.  The couple divorced in 2005.
In 2007, Lockhart married his current wife, lawyer Emiley Zalesky. The couple have two sons, Edward Kellan Lockhart, born in 2010 and Christopher Zalesky Lockhart, born in 2012.

Awards and nominations
Lockhart received the Bob Hope Patriot award from the Congressional Medal of Honor Society in 2006 and was recipient of the 2017 Commonwealth Award, the highest cultural honor bestowed by the state of Massachusetts.

References

1959 births
Living people
American male conductors (music)
Music directors
Musicians from Poughkeepsie, New York
Furman University alumni
Carnegie Mellon University College of Fine Arts alumni
21st-century American conductors (music)
21st-century male musicians